Adorian Aurel Himcinschi (born 31 January 1971) is a Romanian former footballer who played as a defender. After he ended his playing career he worked as a manager at teams from the Romanian lower leagues. His son, Fabian Himcinschi was also a footballer.

Honours

Player
Minaur Zlatna
Divizia C: 2000–01
Apulum Alba Iulia
Divizia B: 2002–03

Notes

References

External links
 

1971 births
Living people
Romanian footballers
Association football defenders
Liga I players
Liga II players
FC CFR Timișoara players
CSM Unirea Alba Iulia players
Romanian football managers
CSM Unirea Alba Iulia managers
Sportspeople from Timișoara